"It's No Good" a song by English electronic music band Depeche Mode, released on 31 March 1997 as the second single from their ninth studio album, Ultra (1997). It was commercially successful, reaching number one in Denmark, Spain, Sweden and on the US Billboard Hot Dance Club Play chart. It entered the top 10 in Finland, Germany, Iceland, Italy, and the United Kingdom, where it peaked at number five.

On 15 May 1997, the band went on The Tonight Show with Jay Leno and performed the song, a recording made available at the official Depeche Mode website. The B-side is an instrumental, called "Slowblow".

Critical reception
Larry Flick from Billboard stated that the song is "considerably more low-key" than their "more caustic" previous hit, "Barrel of a Gun". He added, "In fact, this is the single that diehard Depeche Mode disciples have been starved for, in that it somewhat revisits the stylistic days of "Master and Servant". The music cruises at a funky, electro-pop pace with minimal sound-effect clutter. Rather, the focus is on Dave Gahan's forlorn performance and Martin Gore's sensitive lyrics." Dominic Pride from Music & Media noted that the band "return with a sound which programmers and audiences can instantly recognise and identify with", adding that Gahan's voice "soars above the minimal electronics, which are interspersed with some spartan synth interludes, in a song that glides along smoothly to its conclusion."

Alan Jones from Music Week described it as "a superbly retro track which harks back to their old style. Powerful and synth-based, it is a sublime and slightly disturbing piece that totally contradicts its title." Later, he also declared it "a brooding and menacing monster of a track." A reviewer from Sunday Mirror wrote, "Although the first verse sounds scarily like Jimmy Nail to me, by the time the chorus sets in you recognise that proper Mode sound right away. Not as noisy as the last single but there's a stackful of harder remixes to please the mental, mental crowd".

Track listings
All songs were written by Martin L. Gore.

UK 12-inch single (12 BONG 26)
A1. "It's No Good" (Hardfloor Mix) – 6:43
A1. "It's No Good" (Speedy J Mix) – 5:04
AA1. "It's No Good" (Motor Bass Mix) (Philippe Zdar (later of Cassius) and Étienne de Crécy) – 3:48
AA2. "It's No Good" (Andrea Parker Mix) – 6:14
AA3. "It's No Good" (Bass Bounce Mix; remixed by Dom T) – 7:16

UK CD single (CD Bong 26)
"It's No Good"
"Slowblow" (Darren Price Mix)
"It's No Good" (Bass Bounce Mix)
"It's No Good" (Speedy J Mix)

European CD single (74321482762)
"It's No Good" (Hardfloor Mix)
"Slowblow"
"It's No Good" (Andrea Parker Mix)
"It's No Good" (Motor Bass Mix)

UK cassette single and US 7-inch single (C BONG 26; 7-17390)
"It's No Good" – 5:59
"Slowblow" – 5:25

US 12-inch maxi-single (0-43845)
A1. "It's No Good" (Hardfloor Mix) – 6:41
A2. "It's No Good" (Bass Bounce Mix) – 7:15
B1. "It's No Good" (Speedy J Mix) – 5:00
B2. "Slowblow" (Darren Price Mix) – 6:27

US CD single (9 17390-2, 2-17390)
"It's No Good" – 6:00
"Slowblow" (Darren Price Mix) – 6:27
"It's No Good" (Bass Bounce Mix) – 7:15

US and Canadian maxi-CD single (9 43845-2; CDW 43845)
"It's No Good"
"It's No Good" (Hardfloor Mix)
"Slowblow"
"It's No Good" (Speedy J Mix)
"It's No Good" (Bass Bounce Mix)

Credits and personnel
Credits are taken from the Ultra album booklet.

Studios
Recorded at Abbey Road, Eastcote, Westside, Strongroom, RAK (London, England), Electric Lady (New York City), and Larrabee West (Los Angeles)
Mastered at The Exchange (London, England)

Personnel
Martin Gore – writing (as Martin L. Gore)
Dave Clayton – keyboards, keyboard programming
Victor Indrizzo – percussion
Tim Simenon – production, mixing
Q. – mixing, engineering
Kerry Hopwood – programming
Mike Marsh – mastering

Charts

Weekly charts

Year-end charts

Release history

See also
List of number-one dance singles of 1997 (U.S.)
List of number-one hits of 1997 (Denmark)
List of number-one singles of 1997 (Spain)
List of number-one singles and albums in Sweden

References

External links
Single information from the official Depeche Mode web site
AllMusic Song Review
AllMusic US Single Review 

1997 singles
1997 songs
Depeche Mode songs
Music videos directed by Anton Corbijn
Mute Records singles
Number-one singles in Denmark
Number-one singles in Spain
Number-one singles in Sweden
Reprise Records singles
Songs written by Martin Gore
Song recordings produced by Bomb the Bass